The following is a list of birds found in and around Bangalore in Karnataka, India. 
The Nandi Hills, Bannerghatta forest ranges and the Kaveri valley/Sangam area are included in addition to the Bangalore city limits roughly extending 40 kilometres around the city centre (General Post Office). The area has been studied from early times due to its climate and accessibility during the Colonial period. This list also includes annotations. This list is largely based on an annotated checklist published in 1994. The family placement and sequence of families is based on the IOC world bird list (version 2.9).

Galliformes

Family: Phasianidae 

 Grey francolin, Francolinus pondicerianus (breeding resident on outskirts)
 Common quail, Coturnix coturnix (rare, not seen since 2013)
 Rain quail, Coturnix coromandelica (rare, still common at Hesaraghatta and Maidenahalli areas)
 Jungle bush quail, Perdicula asiatica (breeding resident on outskirts)
 Rock bush quail, Perdicula argoondah (common at Maidenahalli region)
 Painted bush quail, Perdicula erythrorhyncha (rare, no recent records from Bangalore)
 Red spurfowl, Galloperdix spadicea (rare)
 Painted spurfowl, Galloperdix lunulata (rare)
 Grey junglefowl, Gallus sonneratii (breeding resident)
 Indian peafowl, Pavo cristatus (breeding resident)

Anseriformes

Family: Anatidae 

 Fulvous whistling-duck, Dendrocygna bicolor (Vagrant, mostly from old records. However, new sightings have surfaced)
 Lesser whistling-duck, Dendrocygna javanica
 Greylag goose, Anser anser
 Bar-headed goose, Anser indicus
 Ruddy shelduck, Tadorna ferruginea (historic)
 Knob-billed duck, Sarkidiornis melanotos (rare)
 Cotton pygmy goose, Nettapus coromandelianus
 Gadwall, Mareca strepera 
 Eurasian wigeon, Mareca penelope
 Indian spot-billed duck, Anas poecilorhyncha
 Northern shoveler, Spatula clypeata
 Northern pintail, Anas acuta
 Garganey, Spatula querquedula
 Common teal, Anas crecca
 Common pochard, Aythya ferina
 Ferruginous duck, Aythya nyroca (Unconfirmed record from Hesaraghatta, possibly in error)

Podicipediformes

Family: Podicipedidae 
 Little grebe, Tachybaptus ruficollis

Family: Phoenicopteridae 
 Greater flamingo, Phoenicopterus roseus (vagrant. A flock of about 6 individuals recorded at Hoskote lake in September 2019)
 Lesser flamingo, Phoenicopterus minor (vagrant, historic)

Ciconiiformes

Family: Ciconiidae 

 Painted stork, Mycteria leucocephala
 Asian openbill, Anastomus oscitans
 Asian woolly-necked stork, Ciconia episcopus
 White stork, Ciconia ciconia (rare, no recent records in the area for over 6–7 years)
 Black stork, Ciconia nigra (winter visitor)
 Black-necked stork, Ephippiorhynchus asiaticus (could possibly be in error)
 Lesser adjutant, Leptoptilos javanicus (Records north and south of Bangalore, in Mysore and Chikkballapur)

Pelecaniformes

Family: Threskiornithidae 
 Glossy ibis, Plegadis falcinellus
 Black-headed ibis, Threskiornis melanocephalus
 Red-naped ibis, Pseudibis papillosa
 Eurasian spoonbill, Platalea leucorodia

Family: Ardeidae 

 Little egret, Egretta garzetta
 Western reef egret, Egretta gularis (rare)
 Grey heron, Ardea cinerea
 Purple heron, Ardea purpurea
 Eastern great egret, Ardea modesta
 Intermediate egret, Mesophoyx intermedia
 Cattle egret, Bubulcus ibis
 Indian pond heron, Ardeola grayii
 Striated heron, Butorides striatus
 Black-crowned night heron, Nycticorax nycticorax
 Little bittern, Ixobrychus minutus(historical, possibly in error)
 Yellow bittern, Ixobrychus sinensis
 Cinnamon bittern, Ixobrychus cinnamomeus
 Black bittern, Ixobrychus flavicollis (uncommon resident)
 Great bittern, Botaurus stellaris (historic)

Family: Pelecanidae 
 Spot-billed pelican, Pelecanus philippensis
 Great white pelican, Pelecanus onocrotalus (Vagrant ? First noted in 2008. One in 2017 at Ranganathittu)

Suliformes

Family: Phalacrocoracidae 
 Little cormorant, Microcarbo niger
 Indian cormorant, Phalacrocorax fuscicollis
 Great cormorant, Phalacrocorax carbo

Family: Anhingidae 
 Oriental darter, Anhinga melanogaster

Accipitriformes

Family Pandionidae 
 Osprey, Pandion haliaetus (historic, few recent sightings)

Family: Accipitridae 

 Black baza, Aviceda leuphotes (rare, possibly passage migrant, one historic record from Bangalore Golf course, 1980's and one record from Nandi Hills. Newer records could shed light on this species habits in the region.)
 Crested honey buzzard, Pernis ptilorhyncus
 Black-winged kite, Elanus caeruleus
 Black kite, Milvus migrans
 Brahminy kite, Haliastur indus
 Lesser fish eagle, Ichthyophaga humilis (Kaveri valley)
 Grey-headed fish eagle, Ichthyophaga ichthyaetus (Records only from Cauvery WLS area)
 Egyptian vulture, Neophron percnopterus
 White-rumped vulture, Gyps bengalensis (locally extinct in Bangalore, common in Nagarahole NP)
 Indian vulture, Gyps indicus (locally extinct in Bangalore, populations however slowly recovering)
 Himalayan vulture, Gyps himalayensis (rare vagrant - juveniles mainly)
 Red-headed vulture, Sarcogyps calvus (historic, some stragglers still arrive in the Kaveri Valley and the species is relatively common in the Bandipur-Nagarahole region.)
 Short-toed snake eagle, Circaetus gallicus
 Crested serpent eagle, Spilornis cheela
 Marsh harrier, Circus aeruginosus
 Hen harrier, Circus cyaneus
 Pallid harrier, Circus macrourus
 Pied harrier, Circus melanoleucos  
 Montagu's harrier, Circus pygargus
 Crested goshawk, Accipiter trivirgatus (Only from the Cauvery WLS south, although stragglers in Bangalore not unlikely)
 Shikra, Accipiter badius
 Eurasian sparrowhawk, Accipiter nisus
 Northern goshawk, Accipiter gentilis
 Besra, Accipiter virgatus (Rare in Bannerghatta, gets common further south)
 White-eyed buzzard, Butastur teesa
 Black eagle, Ictinaetus malaiensis
 Indian spotted eagle, Clanga hastata (older records of lesser spotted eagle, Aquila pomarina may be attributed to this species)
 Greater spotted eagle, Clanga clanga
 Tawny eagle, Aquila rapax
 Steppe eagle, Aquila nipalensis
 Eastern imperial eagle, Aquila heliaca (historic, possibly in error. Most recent records from Northern Karnataka)
 Bonelli's eagle, Aquila fasciata
 Booted eagle, Hieraaetus pennatus
 Rufous-bellied hawk-eagle, Lophotriorchis kienerii (rare) (a photographic record of a juvenile from the Kaveri valley area, one from Bannerghatta)
 Changeable hawk-eagle, Nisaetus cirrhatus
 Common buzzard, Buteo buteo (Records of birds in Bangalore and outskirts - Arkavathi Layout and other areas)
 Long-legged buzzard, Buteo rufinus (Recent records from north of Bangalore)

Falconiformes

Family: Falconidae 

 Common kestrel, Falco tinnunculus
 Lesser kestrel, Falco naumanni (rare, records from Hesaraghatta and Chikkballapur areas)
 Red-necked falcon, Falco chicquera
 Laggar falcon, Falco jugger
 Eurasian hobby, Falco subbuteo (rare)
 Amur falcon, Falco amurensis (rare, passage)
 Peregrine falcon, Falco peregrinus
 Shaheen falcon, Falco peregrinus peregrinator(resident)
 Peregrine falcon, Falco peregrinus calidus(winter migrant)

Otidiformes

Family: Otididae 
 Great Indian bustard, Ardeotis nigriceps (historic, known from Northeastern Karnataka-the nearest new records)
 Lesser florican, Sypheotides indicus (mostly old records, one in 2011-12 from Hesaraghatta region)

Gruiformes

Family: Rallidae 

 White-breasted waterhen, Amaurornis phoenicurus
 Brown crake, Zapornia akool
 Slaty-legged crake, Rallina eurizonoides (rare, one recent record from the IISc Campus in Bangalore. More usual at BR Hills Tiger Reserve, close to Mysore)
 Spotted crake, Porzana porzana (One recent record from Anekal region, close to Tamil Nadu border)
 Baillon's crake, Zapornia pusilla
 Ruddy-breasted crake, Zapornia fusca
 Slaty-breasted rail, Lewinia striata
 Watercock, Gallicrex cinerea (historic, still exist in small pockets)
 Grey-headed swamphen, Porphyrio poliocephalus
 Common moorhen, Gallinula chloropus
 Eurasian coot, Fulica atra

Family: Gruidae 
 Demoiselle crane, Anthropoides virgo (historic, once recorded at Hulimangala in 2015)

Charadriiformes

Family: Turnicidae 

 Yellow-legged buttonquail, Turnix tanki (rare, only records have been from the Indian Institute of Science campus)
 Barred buttonquail, Turnix suscitator (Uncommon, mostly seen in the Bannerghatta and Kanakapura scrub areas)

Family: Burhinidae 
 Indian stone-curlew, Burhinus indicus (rare)
 Great stone-curlew, Esacus recurvirostris (rare)

Family Recurvirostridae 

 Black-winged stilt, Himantopus himantopus
 Pied avocet, Recurvirostra avosetta (historic, recent records from Sonnapura in Chikkballapura)

Family Charadriidae 

 Pacific golden plover, Pluvialis fulva (rare)
 Grey plover, Pluvialis squatarola (rare)
 Common ringed plover, Charadrius hiaticula (rare, no recent records)
 Little ringed plover, Charadrius dubius (breeding resident)
 Kentish plover, Charadrius alexandrinus
 Yellow-wattled lapwing, Vanellus malabaricus (breeding resident, found only in open areas)
 Grey-headed lapwing, Vanellus cinereus (rare winter visitor)
 Red-wattled lapwing, Vanellus indicus (breeding resident)

Family: Rostratulidae 

 Greater painted snipe, Rostratula benghalensis

Family: Jacanidae 
 Pheasant-tailed jacana, Hydrophasianus chirurgus
 Bronze-winged jacana, Metopidius indicus (common resident)

Family: Scolopacidae 

 Eurasian woodcock, Scolopax rusticola (vagrant)
 Pintail snipe, Gallinago stenura
 Great snipe, Gallinago media (historic)
 Common snipe, Gallinago gallinago
 Wood snipe, Gallinago nemoricola (historic)
 Jack snipe, Lymnocryptes minimus (Not many recent reports)
 Black-tailed godwit, Limosa limosa
 Eurasian curlew, Numenius arquata
 Eurasian whimbrel, Numenius phaeopus (rare passage migrant?)
 Spotted redshank, Tringa erythropus
 Common redshank, Tringa totanus
 Marsh sandpiper, Tringa stagnatilis
 Common greenshank, Tringa nebularia
 Green sandpiper, Tringa ochropus
 Wood sandpiper, Tringa glareola
 Terek sandpiper, Xenus cinereus
 Common sandpiper, Actitis hypoleucos
 Dunlin, Calidris alpina (Recent record from Hesaraghatta)
 Curlew sandpiper, Calidris ferruginea
 Little stint, Calidris minuta
 Temminck's stint, Calidris temminckii
 Long-toed stint, Calidris subminuta
 Ruff, Philomachus pugnax
 Red-necked phalarope, Phalaropus lobatus (historic and rare passage migrant)

Family: Glareolidae 
 Indian courser, Cursorius coromandelicus (Dr Robert B. Watson shot an Indian courser from a flock on 26 April 1952 and again saw two birds when he visited on 15 May 1952.)
 Small pratincole, Glareola lactea
Oriental pratincole, Glareola maldivarum
Collared pratincole, Glareola pratincola

Family: Laridae 
 Brown-headed gull, Chroicocephalus brunnicephalus
 Black-headed gull, Chroicocephalus ridibundus
 Slender-billed gull, Chroicocephalus genei (rare. First record in Nov 2016 - 3 individuals in Madivala Lake, one recently spotted at Hesaraghatta)
 Heuglin's gull, Larus fuscus heuglini (telemetry shows it flew over Bangalore)

Family Sternidae 
 Gull-billed tern, Gelochelidon nilotica (rare)
 Caspian tern, Hydroprogne caspia (rare)
 River tern, Sterna aurantia
 Black-bellied tern, Sterna acuticauda (rare, recent records only from Talakad near Mysore)
 Little tern, Sternula albifrons (rare with few records near Bangalore)
 Whiskered tern, Chlidonias hybrida
 White-winged tern, Chlidonias leucopterus (rare, few records from north region)

Pterocliformes

Family: Pteroclidae 
 Painted sandgrouse, Pterocles indicus (rare, only a few records in recent times)
 Chestnut-bellied sandgrouse, Pterocles exustus (historic, some new records from Maidenahalli)

Columbiformes

Family: Columbidae 

 Rock pigeon, Columba livia
 Nilgiri wood pigeon, Columba elphinstonii (only in Nandi Hills - historic record from Bannerghatta National Park)
 Green imperial pigeon, Ducula aenea (Only from Cauvery WLS; a recent record exists from Pearl Valley)
 Laughing dove, Spilopelia senegalensis
 Spotted dove, Spilopelia chinensis
 Oriental turtle dove, Streptopelia orientalis (rare)
 Red collared dove, Streptopelia tranquebarica (rare)
 Eurasian collared dove, Streptopelia decaocto
 Yellow-footed green pigeon, Treron phoenicoptera (rare)
 Orange-breasted green pigeon, Treron bicincta (rare) (A few records in 2006 and 2011 from Hesaraghatta and Indian Institute of Science, one more recently from B M Kaval Forest)
Grey-fronted green pigeon, Treron affinis (rare, records only from Bannerghatta National Park)

Psittaciformes

Family: Psittacidae 
 Alexandrine parakeet, Psittacula eupatria (rare)
 Rose-ringed parakeet, Psittacula krameri (breeding resident)
 Plum-headed parakeet, Psittacula cyanocephala (unclear pattern, but commoner in winter)
 Blue-winged parakeet, Psittacula columboides (historic, but recent records from near the Kanakapura and Thali forest areas. Most recent record from Bangalore University Campus in 2021)
 Red-breasted parakeet, Psittacula alexandri (introduced escapees)
 Vernal hanging parrot, Loriculus vernalis (records in Bangalore have been only from the Indian Institute of Science campus. Rather surprisingly, there have been increasing recent records in and near the Devarayanadurga Forest region.)

Cuculiformes

Family: Cuculidae 

 Pied cuckoo, Clamator jacobinus
 Chestnut-winged cuckoo, Clamator coromandus (rare, a few records from Bangalore and adjoining regions)
 Large hawk-cuckoo, Hierococcyx sparverioides (One recent record from Valley School (B M Kaval). More common at the Bandipur and Nagarahole NPs)
 Common hawk-cuckoo, Hierococcyx varius
 Indian cuckoo, Cuculus micropterus (Uncommon, becoming increasingly rare/elusive)
 Common cuckoo, Cuculus canorus (passage)
Himalayan cuckoo, Cuculus saturatus (possibly in error)
 Lesser cuckoo, Cuculus poliocephalus (BngBirds in 2014 from Hesserghatta, passage)
 Banded bay cuckoo, Cacomantis sonneratii (rare)
 Grey-bellied cuckoo, Cacomantis passerinus
Fork-tailed drongo-cuckoo, Surniculus dicruroides
 Asian koel, Eudynamys scolopacea
 Blue-faced malkoha, Phaenicophaeus viridirostris
 Sirkeer malkoha, Phaenicophaeus leschenaultii (rare, reported from Maidenahalli)
 Greater coucal, Centropus sinensis

Strigiformes

Family: Tytonidae 
 Eastern barn owl, Tyto javanica

Family: Strigidae 

 Short-eared owl, Asio flammeus (rare, vagrant)
 Oriental scops owl, Otus sunia
 Indian scops owl, Otus bakkamoena
 Indian eagle-owl, Bubo bengalensis (Found in rocky outcrops such as at the NICE expressway, declining fast from urbanisation)
 Spot-bellied eagle-owl, Bubo nipalensis (historic records from Kaveri valley. One juvenile was recorded by a camera trap at Bilikal Betta, Ramanagara district in 2015)
 Brown fish owl, Ketupa zeylonensis (Records only from the Bannerghatta National Park in Bangalore, not rare in Kaveri Valley)
 Mottled wood owl, Strix ocellata
Brown-wood owl, Strix leptogrammica (rare, records so far only from Bannerghatta area and GKVK Campus)
 Jungle owlet, Glaucidium radiatum
 Spotted owlet, Athene brama
 Brown boobook, Ninox scutulata (rare, except in Kaveri Valley where the species is fairly common)

Caprimulgiformes

Family: Caprimulgidae 
 Jungle nightjar, Caprimulgus indicus
 Sykes's nightjar, Caprimulgus mahrattensis (historic)
 Jerdon's nightjar, Caprimulgus atripennis
 Indian nightjar, Caprimulgus asiaticus
 Savanna nightjar, Caprimulgus affinis
 Grey nightjar, Caprimulgus jotaka (specimen examined by S A Hussain)

Apodiformes

Family: Hemiprocnidae 
 Crested treeswift, Hemiprocne coronata

Family: Apodidae 

 Indian swiftlet, Collocalia unicolor (rare)
 White-rumped needletail, Zoonavena sylvatica (rare)
 Brown-backed needletail, Hirundapus giganteus (rare)
 Asian palm swift, Cypsiurus balasiensis
 Alpine swift, Tachymarptis melba
 Blyth's swift, Apus leuconyx (Mainly Bandipur NP, records in Bangalore only at JB Kaval forest)
 House swift, Apus affinis

Coraciiformes

Family: Coraciidae 

 Indian roller, Coracias benghalensis
 European roller, Coracias garrulus (records from Hesaraghatta and Maidenahalli region, passage)

Family: Alcedinidae 

 Oriental dwarf kingfisher, Ceyx erithaca (vagrant reported from Horamavu in 2017)
 Common kingfisher, Alcedo atthis
 Stork-billed kingfisher, Halcyon capensis (vagrant except in the Kaveri river valley area)
 White-throated kingfisher, Halcyon smyrnensis (breeding resident)
 Black-capped kingfisher, Halcyon pileata (vagrant)
 Pied kingfisher, Ceryle rudis

Family: Meropidae 

 Blue-bearded bee-eater, Nyctyornis athertoni (Bangalore is the type locality, but rare and known only from the Bannerghatta area)
 Asian green bee-eater, Merops orientalis
 Blue-tailed bee-eater, Merops philippinus
 European bee-eater, Merops apiaster (High numbers come as passage migrants in the Kaveri Valley during winter)
 Chestnut-headed bee-eater, Merops leschenaulti (vagrant)

Bucerotiformes

Family: Upupidae 
 Hoopoe, Upupa epops

Family: Bucerotidae 
 Indian grey hornbill, Ocyceros birostris

Piciformes

Family: Picidae 
 Eurasian wryneck, Jynx torquilla (rare with records from GKVK and the Valley School area)
 Brown-capped pygmy woodpecker, Yungipicus nanus
 Yellow-crowned woodpecker, Leiopicus mahrattensis
 Rufous woodpecker, Micropternus brachyurus (rare, recorded mainly from Bannerghatta and Kaveri Valley)
 Lesser yellownape, Picus chlorolophus (one recent record from Nandi Hills, could be found in Cauvery WLS)
 Streak-throated woodpecker, Picus xanthopygaeus (found mainly in Bannerghatta forest)
 Black-rumped flameback, Dinopium benghalense
 White-naped woodpecker, Chrysocolaptes festivus

Family: Megalaimidae 

 Brown-headed barbet, Psilopogon zeylanicus (rare)
 White-cheeked barbet, Psilopogon viridis (breeding resident)
 Coppersmith barbet, Psilopogon haemacephalus (breeding resident)

Passeriformes

Family: Pittidae

 Indian pitta, Pitta brachyura

Family: Tephrodornithidae 
 Common woodshrike, Tephrodornis pondicerianus

Family: Artamidae
 Ashy woodswallow, Artamus fuscus

Family: Aegithinidae 
 Common iora, Aegithina tiphia
 Marshall's iora, Aegithina nigrolutea (nearest records from Maidenahalli & Kaveri Valley)

Family: Campephagidae 
 Large cuckoo-shrike, Coracina macei
 Black-winged cuckoo-shrike, Lalage melaschistos (records only from IISc Campus and Nandi Hills)
 Black-headed cuckoo-shrike, Lalage melanoptera
 Small minivet, Pericrocotus cinnamomeus
 White-bellied minivet, Pericrocotus erythropygius (One recent record in Kaveri valley)
 Ashy minivet, Pericrocotus divaricatus 
 Swinhoe's minivet, Pericrocotus cantonensis (vagrant, one straggler seen along with Ashy minivet at GKVK)

Family: Laniidae
 Brown shrike, Lanius cristatus (regular winter visitor)
 Lanius cristatus lucionensis (rare)
 Isabelline shrike, Lanius isabellinus (rare. Photo record 7 December 2008)
 Bay-backed shrike, Lanius vittatus
 Long-tailed shrike, Lanius schach
 Great grey shrike, Lanius excubitor (rare, reported mainly from Maidenahalli)

Family: Oriolidae 

 Indian golden oriole, Oriolus kundoo

 Black-naped oriole, Oriolus chinensis (not rare, but doesn't winter as profusely as Indian golden)
 Black-hooded oriole, Oriolus xanthornus

Family: Dicruridae
 Black drongo, Dicrurus macrocercus
 Ashy drongo, Dicrurus leucophaeus
 Bronzed drongo, Dicrurus aeneus (Records from Bannerghatta forest and Pearl Valley region)
 Greater racket-tailed drongo, Dicrurus paradiseus (Records from Bannerghatta region)
 White-bellied drongo, Dicrurus caerulescens
 Hair-crested drongo, Dicrurus hottentottus

Family: Rhipiduridae 
 White-spotted fantail, Rhipidura albogularis
 White-browed fantail, Rhipidura aureola

Family: Monarchidae
 Black-naped monarch, Hypothymis azurea
 Indian paradise flycatcher, Terpsiphone paradisi

Family: Corvidae
 Rufous treepie, Dendrocitta vagabunda
 White-bellied treepie, Dendrocitta leucogastra (historic, possibly in error)
 House crow, Corvus splendens
 Indian jungle crow, Corvus macrorhynchos culminatus

Family: Stenostiridae 
 Grey-headed canary flycatcher, Culicicapa ceylonensis (historic records, only recent records from Bannerghatta National Park and Indian Institute of Science)

Family: Paridae 
 Cinereous tit, Parus cinereus
 White-winged tit, Parus nuchalis (historic record from Bangalore, more recent records only from the Kaveri valley)
 Indian black-lored tit, Machlolophus aplonotus (historic)

Family: Alaudidae 

 Singing bushlark, Mirafra cantillans (Possibly misidentified. Records known from near Mysore and Jayamangali Black Buck Reserve)
 Indian bushlark, Mirafra erythroptera
 Jerdon's bushlark, Mirafra affinis
 Ashy-crowned sparrow-lark, Eremopterix griseus
 Rufous-tailed lark, Ammomanes phoenicura
 Greater short-toed lark, Calandrella brachydactyla
 Mongolian short-toed lark, Calandrella dukhunensis (High numbers still winter at Hesaraghatta)
 Sykes's lark, Galerida deva (known only from the Thippagondanahalli Reservoir area and Hesaraghatta)
 Oriental skylark, Alauda gulgula

Family: Pycnonotidae 

 Red-whiskered bulbul, Pycnonotus jocosus (Earliest published record of four specimens of this bird from Bangalore was collected by HG Walton between 15 and 20 January 1899 said to be in Bombay Natural History Society collection. This bird was once considered rare around Bangalore but quite common in Nandi Hills.)
 White-eared bulbul, Pycnonotus leucotis (possible escapee)
 Red-vented bulbul, Pycnonotus cafer
 Yellow-throated bulbul, Pycnonotus xantholaemus
 White-browed bulbul, Pycnonotus luteolus

Family: Hirundinidae 
 Sand martin/Pale martin, Riparia riparia/Riparia diluta (vagrant)
 Grey-throated martin, Riparia chinensis 
 Dusky crag martin, Ptyonoprogne concolor
 Common house-martin, Delichon urbicum (rare with very few records, usually seen amongst mixed flocks)
 Barn swallow, Hirundo rustica
 Pacific swallow, Hirundo tahitica
 Wire-tailed swallow, Hirundo smithii
 Red-rumped swallow, Cecropis daurica
 Streak-throated swallow, Hirundo fluvicola

Family: Phylloscopidae
 Tickell's leaf warbler, Phylloscopus affinis
 Sulphur-bellied warbler, Phylloscopus griseolus
 Yellow-browed warbler, Phylloscopus inornatus (rare, recent records from Lalbagh and Bannerghatta regions)
 Hume's leaf warbler, Phylloscopus humei (Nandi Hills)
 Tytler's leaf warbler, Phylloscopus tytleri (Nandi Hills)
 Common chiffchaff, Phylloscopus collybita (historic, rare vagrant at Nandi Hills)
Green warbler, Phylloscopus nitidus
 Greenish warbler, Phylloscopus trochiloides
 Large-billed leaf warbler, Phylloscopus magnirostris
 Western crowned warbler, Phylloscopus occipitalis

Family: Acrocephalidae 
 Paddyfield warbler, Acrocephalus agricola
 Blyth's reed warbler, Acrocephalus dumetorum
 Clamorous reed warbler, Acrocephalus stentoreus
 Thick-billed warbler, Arundinax aedon
 Sykes's warbler, Iduna rama 
 Booted warbler, Iduna caligata

Family: Cisticolidae 

 Zitting cisticola, Cisticola juncidis
 Grey-breasted prinia, Prinia hodgsonii
 Jungle prinia, Prinia sylvatica
 Ashy prinia, Prinia socialis
 Plain prinia, Prinia inornata
 Rufous-fronted prinia, Prinia buchanani (nearest records from Maidenahalli)
 Common tailorbird, Orthotomus sutorius

Family: Locustellidae 

 Common grasshopper warbler, Locustella naevia (rare, sparse records around Bangalore)
 Pallas grasshopper warbler, Helopsaltes certhiola (rare, one recent record from Anekal region)
 Bristled grassbird, Chaetornis striata (One record from Hoskote Lake)

Family: Pellorneidae
 Puff-throated babbler, Pellorneum ruficeps

Family: Timaliidae 
 Indian scimitar babbler, Pomatorhinus horsfieldii
 Tawny-bellied babbler, Dumetia hyperythra

Family: Leiothrichidae 

 Common babbler, Argya caudata
 Large grey babbler, Argya malcolmi
 Rufous babbler, Argya subrufa (escaped individual seen near Cubbon Park)
 Jungle babbler, Argya striata
 Yellow-billed babbler, Argya affinis
 Brown-cheeked fulvetta, Alcippe poioicephala (One recent record from Bannerghatta Forest-Shivanahalli region)

Family: Sittidae 

 Velvet-fronted nuthatch, Sitta frontalis (One recent record from Valley School)

Family: Sylviidae
 Eastern Orphean warbler, Sylvia crassirostris
 Lesser whitethroat, Sylvia curruca (populations not ascertained reliably) 
 Hume's lesser whitethroat, S. c. althaea (taxonomy dependant)
 Yellow-eyed babbler, Chrysomma sinense

Family: Zosteropidae 
 Indian white-eye, Zosterops palpebrosus

Family: Sturnidae

 Chestnut-tailed starling, Sturnia malabarica (winter visitor)
 Malabar starling, Sturnia blythii (vagrant, historic record from GKVK Campus)
 Brahminy starling, Sturnia pagodarum (resident)
 Rosy starling, Pastor roseus (winter visitor)
 Common starling, Sturnus vulgaris (vagrant)
 Common myna, Acridotheres tristis (resident)
 Jungle myna, Acridotheres fuscus (resident)

Family: Turdidae 

 Pied thrush, Geokichla wardii (winter visitor, regular only in the Nandi hills)
 White-throated orange-headed thrush, Geokichla citrina cyanota
 Scaly thrush, Zoothera dauma (historic)
 Tickell's thrush, Turdus unicolor (Once in 2005 at Lalbagh, records popping up elsewhere)
 Indian blackbird, Turdus simillimus (winter, regular only in the Nandi hills. Older records of common blackbird, Turdus merula, may be attributed to this species)
 Eyebrowed thrush, Turdus obscurus (vagrant)

Family: Muscicapidae 
 Northern wheatear, Oenanthe oenanthe (One recent record from Jayamangali Blackbuck Reserve, a first for Karnataka)
 Blue-capped rock thrush, Monticola cinclorhyncha (winter visitor)
 Blue rock thrush, Monticola solitarius (winter visitor in rocky areas)
 Common rock thrush, Monticola saxatilis (vagrant)
 Malabar whistling thrush, Myophonus horsfieldii (vagrant at UAS, Hebbal. From 2005 found in the Nandi Hills)
 Bluethroat, Luscinia svecica
 Indian blue robin, Luscinia brunnea (winter, regular in the Nandi hills)
 Siberian rubythroat, Calliope calliope (Nearest record from Maidenahalli and the Savandurga area)
 Oriental magpie robin, Copsychus saularis (resident breeder)
 White-rumped shama, Copsychus malabaricus (rare resident, known only from the JP Nagar Reserve Forest (Doresanipalya), Bannerghatta forest area, Valley School areas and further away in the Kaveri valley)
 Indian robin, Saxicoloides fulicatus (resident, found in open scrub in the outskirts)
 Black redstart, Phoenicurus ochruros (winter)
 Siberian stonechat, Saxicola maurus (winter)
 Pied bush chat, Saxicola caprata (resident, found in open scrub in the outskirts)
 Asian brown flycatcher, Muscicapa dauurica (winter)
 Brown-breasted flycatcher, Muscicapa muttui (winter)
 Yellow-rumped flycatcher, Ficedula zanthopygia (winter, vagrant)
 Rusty-tailed flycatcher, Ficedula ruficauda (winter, rare)
 Red-breasted flycatcher, Ficedula parva (winter)
 Red-throated flycatcher, Ficedula albicilla (winter)
 Kashmir flycatcher, Ficedula subrubra (rare, passage)
 Ultramarine flycatcher, Ficedula superciliaris (winter, regular in the Nandi hills)
 Black-and-orange flycatcher, Ficedula nigrorufa (Vagrant - two records. Confirmation desirable, recent records in Karnataka only from the shola forests in the Brahmagiri and Bababudan Hill ranges)
 Verditer flycatcher, Eumyias thalassina (winter, not uncommon in scrub forest areas)
 Nilgiri flycatcher, Eumyias albicaudatus (historic and needs confirmation)
 Blue-throated flycatcher, Cyornis rubeculoides (winter, possibly in passage)
 Tickell's blue flycatcher, Cyornis tickelliae (resident breeder)

Family: Chloropseidae
 Jerdon's leafbird, Chloropsis jerdoni
 Golden-fronted leafbird, Chloropsis aurifrons

Family: Dicaeidae 
 Thick-billed flowerpecker, Dicaeum agile (rare)
 Pale-billed flowerpecker, Dicaeum erythrorynchos

Family: Nectariniidae 

 Purple-rumped sunbird, Nectarinia zeylonica
 Purple sunbird, Cinnyris asiaticus
 Loten's sunbird, Cinnyris lotenius
 Crimson-backed sunbird, Leptocoma minima (Monsoon migrant to Nandi Hills)

Family: Passeridae 
 House sparrow, Passer domesticus
 Yellow-throated sparrow, Gymnoris xanthocollis

Family: Ploceidae 

 Streaked weaver, Ploceus manyar
 Baya weaver, Ploceus philippinus
 Bengal weaver, Ploceus benghalensis (One known resident population from Hoskote Lake. Vagrant elsewhere)

Family: Estrildidae 
 Red munia, Amandava amandava
 Indian silverbill, Euodice malabarica
 White-rumped munia, Lonchura striata
 Scaly-breasted munia, Lonchura punctulata
 Tricoloured munia, Lochura malacca

Family: Motacillidae 

 Forest wagtail, Dendronanthus indicus
 White wagtail, Motacilla alba
 White-browed wagtail, Motacilla maderaspatensis
 Citrine wagtail, Motacilla citreola citreola
 Yellow wagtail, Motacilla flava
 Eastern yellow wagtail, Motacilla tschutschensis (Mostlly recent records, in Hesaraghatta and Hoskote areas)
 Grey wagtail, Motacilla cinerea
 Richard's pipit, Anthus richardi
 Red-throated pipit, Anthus cervinus
 Paddyfield pipit, Anthus rufulus
 Tawny pipit, Anthus campestris (Recent records from Maidenahalli)
 Blyth's pipit, Anthus godlewskii
 Long-billed pipit, Anthus similis
 Tree pipit, Anthus trivialis
 Olive-backed pipit, Anthus hodgsoni (Mainly Nandi Hills, some arrive at Namadachilume forest)

Family: Fringillidae 
 Common rosefinch, Carpodacus erythrinus (winter visitor)

Family: Emberizidae 
 Black-headed bunting, Emberiza melanocephala (historic)
 Red-headed bunting, Emberiza bruniceps (historic)
 Grey-necked bunting, Emberiza buchanani

See also
 Birdwatchers' Field Club of Bangalore

References

Bangalore
Birds, Bangalore
Birds